Skyline Plaza is a private housing estate and shopping mall in Tsuen Wan, Hong Kong. It is close to the Tsuen Wan Town Hall, Tsuen Wan Ferry Pier, Nina Tower and MTR Tsuen Wan West station. It was developed by the Henderson Land Development in April 1995.

Shopping mall
Former tenants of the Skyline Plaza shopping mall include two large supermarkets, a Park'n Megastore and a Carrefour (closed in 2000). In January 2012, Skyline Plaza closed and was renovating to later relocate a Æon Department Store from the nearby Tsuen Wan Plaza to this location. The department store was opened on 20 October 2012.

Residential
The residential part of Skyline Plaza is located on the 4–39 floor with a platform garden and swimming pool on the fourth floor. Each floor has 8 units lettered A–H.

See also
Citywalk, Hong Kong

References

External links

Official website of Skyline Plaza

Private housing estates in Hong Kong
Shopping centres in Hong Kong
Buildings and structures completed in 1995
Tsuen Wan
Henderson Land Development
1995 establishments in Hong Kong
Shopping malls established in 1995